Henry Salt may refer to:

Henry Stephens Salt (1851–1939), English writer, campaigner for social reforms, vegetarian, and animal rights advocate
Henry Salt (Egyptologist) (1780–1827), English artist, traveller, diplomat, and Egyptologist
Mr. Salt (Mr. Henry Salt), fictional character from the children's book Charlie and the Chocolate Factory